Victoria was a provincial electoral district in the Canadian province of British Columbia, and was one of the first twelve ridings at the time of that province's joining Confederation in 1871 and stayed on the hustings until 1890.  From 1894 to 1963 it did not appear on the electoral map.  During that period the Victoria area was represented by North Victoria, South Victoria, Saanich, Esquimalt, Oak Bay and Victoria City.  In 1966 the old Victoria City riding was redistributed and given the name of the old "rural" riding, Victoria.

Demographics

Political geography

Notable elections

Notable MLAs 

Amor De Cosmos, 2nd Premier of British Columbia

Electoral history 
Note:  Winners of each election are in bold.

|-

|Independent
|Arthur Bunster
|align="right"|123
|align="right"|32.63%
|align="right"|
|align="right"|unknown

|Independent
|William Dalby
|align="right"|103
|align="right"|27.32%
|align="right"|
|align="right"|unknown

|Independent
|Amor De Cosmos
|align="right"|151
|align="right"|40.05%
|align="right"|
|align="right"|unknown

|}

|-

|Independent
|William Dalby
|align="right"|97
|align="right"|21.90%
|align="right"|
|align="right"|unknown

|Independent
|Charles William Horth
|align="right"|25
|align="right"|5.64%
|align="right"|
|align="right"|unknown

|Independent
|James Thomas McIlmoyl
|align="right"|72
|align="right"|16.25%
|align="right"|
|align="right"|unknown

|Independent
|William Archibald Robertson
|align="right"|108
|align="right"|24.38%
|align="right"|
|align="right"|unknown

|Independent
|William Fraser Tolmie
|align="right"|141
|align="right"|31.83%
|align="right"|
|align="right"|unknown

|- bgcolor="white"
!align="right" colspan=7|1  The byelection was due to resignations February 9, 1874 of A. Bunster and A. De Cosmos upon winning seats in the federal election January 22, 1874 (in Vancouver and Victoria federal ridings, respectively).
|}

|-

|Independent
|Thomas Basil Humphreys
|align="right"|Acclaimed
|align="right"| -.- %
|align="right"|
|align="right"|unknown
|- bgcolor="white"
!align="right" colspan=3|Total valid votes
!align="right"|n/a
!align="right"| -.- %
!align="right"|
|- bgcolor="white"
!align="right" colspan=3|Total rejected ballots
!align="right"|
!align="right"|
!align="right"|
|- bgcolor="white"
!align="right" colspan=3|Turnout
!align="right"|%
!align="right"|
!align="right"|
|- bgcolor="white"
!align="right" colspan=7|2  The byelection was called due to Humphreys' resignation upon appointment to the Executive Council (cabinet) upon his appointment to the Executive Council (cabinet) June 26, 1878.  This byelection was one of a series held to confirm appointments to the Executive Council, which was the old parliamentary convention.  As this byelection writ was filled by acclamation, no polling day was required and the seat was filled within two weeks.  The stated date is the date the return of writs was received by the Chief Electoral Officer.
|}

|-

|- bgcolor="white"
!align="right" colspan=3|Total valid votes
!align="right"|389 
|}

|- bgcolor="white"
!align="right" colspan=3|Total valid votes
!align="right"|495 
!align="right"|100.00%
!align="right"|
|- bgcolor="white"
!align="right" colspan=3|Total rejected ballots
!align="right"|
!align="right"|
!align="right"|
|- bgcolor="white"
!align="right" colspan=3|Turnout
!align="right"|%
!align="right"|
!align="right"|
|}

|- bgcolor="white"
!align="right" colspan=3|Total valid votes
!align="right"|462 
!align="right"|100.00%
!align="right"|
|- bgcolor="white"
!align="right" colspan=3|Total rejected ballots
!align="right"|
!align="right"|
!align="right"|
|- bgcolor="white"
!align="right" colspan=3|Turnout
!align="right"|%
!align="right"|
!align="right"|
|}

For the 1894 election the Victoria riding was redistributed into North Victoria and South Victoria.  The Victoria riding name did not reappear until the 1966 election.  As before, it was a two-member seat:

|-

|Liberal
|John W. Porteus
|align="right"|4,774 	
|align="right"|10.54%
|align="right"|
|align="right"|unknown

|Liberal
|Frank D. Preston
|align="right"|4,597 	
|align="right"|10.14%
|align="right"|
|align="right"|unknown

|- bgcolor="white"
!align="right" colspan=3|Total valid votes
!align="right"|45,315
!align="right"|100.00%
!align="right"|
|- bgcolor="white"
!align="right" colspan=3|Total rejected ballots
!align="right"|264
!align="right"|
!align="right"|
|- bgcolor="white"
!align="right" colspan=3|Turnout
!align="right"|%
!align="right"|
!align="right"|
|}

|-

|Liberal
|Mel Couvelier
|align="right"|4,497 	
|align="right"|7.76%
|align="right"|
|align="right"|unknown

|Independent
|William Alfred Scott
|align="right"|259 	
|align="right"|0.45%
|align="right"|
|align="right"|unknown

|Liberal
|Ian Hugh Stewart
|align="right"|5,334 	
|align="right"|9.20%
|align="right"|
|align="right"|unknown
|- bgcolor="white"
!align="right" colspan=3|Total valid votes
!align="right"|57,955 	
!align="right"|100.00%
!align="right"|
|- bgcolor="white"
!align="right" colspan=3|Total rejected ballots
!align="right"|496
!align="right"|
!align="right"|
|- bgcolor="white"
!align="right" colspan=3|Turnout
!align="right"|%
!align="right"|
!align="right"|
|}

|-

|Conservative
|Edith Rose Sophia Gunning
|align="right"|7,843 	
|align="right"|11.67%
|align="right"|
|align="right"|unknown

|Conservative
|Albert Clyde Savage
|align="right"|6,218 	
|align="right"|9.26%
|align="right"|
|align="right"|unknown

|- bgcolor="white"
!align="right" colspan=3|Total valid votes
!align="right"|67,182 	
!align="right"|100.00%
!align="right"|
|- bgcolor="white"
!align="right" colspan=3|Total rejected ballots
!align="right"|497
!align="right"|
!align="right"|
|- bgcolor="white"
!align="right" colspan=3|Turnout
!align="right"|%
!align="right"|
!align="right"|
|}

|-

|Conservative
|William Loyd Burdon
|align="right"|2,558 	
|align="right"|3.55%
|align="right"|
|align="right"|unknown

|Independent
|Richard Owen Kavanagh
|align="right"|148 			
|align="right"|0.21%
|align="right"|
|align="right"|unknown

|Independent
|William Alfred Scott
|align="right"|349 	
|align="right"|0.48%
|align="right"|
|align="right"|unknown

|Conservative
|Peter Bruce Stanley
|align="right"|2,179 		
|align="right"|3.02%
|align="right"|
|align="right"|unknown
|- bgcolor="white"
!align="right" colspan=3|Total valid votes
!align="right"|72,145 
!align="right"|100.00%
!align="right"|
|- bgcolor="white"
!align="right" colspan=3|Total rejected ballots
!align="right"|691
!align="right"|
!align="right"|
|- bgcolor="white"
!align="right" colspan=3|Turnout
!align="right"|%
!align="right"|
!align="right"|
|}

|-

|Conservative
|Jack Lindsay
|align="right"|2,195 		
|align="right"|2.73%
|align="right"|
|align="right"|unknown

|Conservative
|Margaret M. (Maggi) Lynn
|align="right"|2,018 	
|align="right"|2.51%
|align="right"|
|align="right"|unknown

|- bgcolor="white"
!align="right" colspan=3|Total valid votes
!align="right"|80,339 	
!align="right"|100.00%
!align="right"|
|- bgcolor="white"
!align="right" colspan=3|Total rejected ballots
!align="right"|1,107
!align="right"|
!align="right"|
|- bgcolor="white"
!align="right" colspan=3|Turnout
!align="right"|%
!align="right"|
!align="right"|
|}

|-

|Independent
|Balther Johannes Jensen
|align="right"|406 	
|align="right"|0.49%
|align="right"|
|align="right"|unknown

|Liberal
|[Victor Evan Lindal
|align="right"|1,158 	
|align="right"|1.39%
|align="right"|
|align="right"|unknown

|Liberal
|William John McElroy
|align="right"|1,271 	
|align="right"|1.53%
|align="right"|
|align="right"|unknown

|Independent
|David Michael Shebib
|align="right"|242 	
|align="right"|0.29%
|align="right"|
|align="right"|unknown

|- bgcolor="white"
!align="right" colspan=3|Total valid votes
!align="right"|83,112 
!align="right"|100.00%
!align="right"|
|- bgcolor="white"
!align="right" colspan=3|Total rejected ballots
!align="right"|610
!align="right"|
!align="right"|
|- bgcolor="white"
!align="right" colspan=3|Turnout
!align="right"|%
!align="right"|
!align="right"|
|}

|-

|-

|Independent
|Balther Johannes Jensen
|align="right"|215 	
|align="right"|0.27%
|align="right"|
|align="right"|unknown

|Liberal
|Tom W. Morino
|align="right"|2,235 	
|align="right"|2.79%
|align="right"|
|align="right"|unknown

|- bgcolor="white"
!align="right" colspan=3|Total valid votes
!align="right"|80,023 
!align="right"|100.00%
!align="right"|
|- bgcolor="white"
!align="right" colspan=3|Total rejected ballots
!align="right"|748
!align="right"|
!align="right"|
|- bgcolor="white"
!align="right" colspan=3|Turnout
!align="right"|%
!align="right"|
!align="right"|
|}

Sources 

Elections BC Historical Returns

Former provincial electoral districts of British Columbia on Vancouver Island